Justicia betonica is a species of flowering plant, a shrub in the family Acanthaceae. It goes by the common name squirrel's tail and paper plume.

Range
The species is native to Angola, Bangladesh, Botswana, South Africa, Eswatini, Ethiopia, India, Kenya, Malawi, Mali, Mozambique, Namibia, Senegal, Sri Lanka, Sudan, South Sudan, Tanzania, Uganda, Zambia, Democratic Republic of the Congo, and Zimbabwe.

The species was introduced to Colombia, Costa Rica, Guyana, Panamá, Solomon Islands as well as regions like Hawaii, and New Caledonia.

It is also found in tropical regions of China, Australia, Malaysia, Philippines, and Indonesia.

Its habitat includes wastelands, hedges, and ravines.

References 

betonica